Alessandro Siciliani (born 1952) is an Italian conductor of opera and symphonic music. He is also a composer of symphonic music. Siciliani currently resides in Columbus, Ohio, where he was the music director of the Columbus Symphony Orchestra from 1992 to 2004.

Life and career
Siciliani's early life was spent growing up in the opera world of Italy where his father was the director of the country's most prominent opera company, La Scala from 1957 until 1966. His musical interests were formed while attending his father's rehearsals where he had the opportunity to rub shoulders with the world's leading conductors, musicians and opera stars.

Siciliani received his musical training at the Giuseppe Verdi Conservatory in Milan and at the Santa Cecilia Academy in Rome. His studies focused on conducting, which he studied with Franco Ferrara, piano, and composition, graduating with highest honors in all three.

As a conductor, Siciliani has divided his time between opera and the symphonic repertoire. In opera, he conducted extensively at the New York City Opera and made his debut with the Metropolitan Opera on opening night of the 1988/1989 season. Most recently he conducted at the Mariinsky Theatre (formerly the Kirov) in Saint Petersburg, Russia in 2008. As a symphonic conductor he has performed with major orchestras in Prague, Munich, Cologne, Dallas, Pittsburgh, and Washington DC, among many others.

From 1992 to 2004 he was the music director of the Columbus Symphony Orchestra. During his time on the podium the orchestra achieved some of its greatest successes to date, increasing its audience and celebrating its 50th anniversary with a debut appearance at Carnegie Hall. Siciliani's vivid interpretations of the romantic symphonic repertoire and of Italian opera endeared him to audiences in Columbus where he remains a popular figure. In July 2008, he was enthusiastically received when he returned to the podium to conduct the musicians of the Columbus Symphony in a benefit concert during the CSO's recent contract dispute.

Currently, Siciliani maintains his career as a conductor, making guest appearances in Europe and the U.S. He also continues composing, writing works for symphony and chorus.

Early life 
Siciliani grew up in Florence and Milan in the home of his parents Ambra and Francesco Siciliani. His father was one of the most important and powerful Artistic Directors in Europe in the 20th century who helped revive some of Italy’s great opera houses after World War II.

Francesco Siciliani was Artistic Director and Manager of La Scala in Milan, The San Carlo in Naples, La Ferenci in Venice, and Theatre Covenale in Florence. He was famous for promoting the early career of such artists as Maria Callas, Renata Tebaldi, and Mario del Monaco.

Alessandro attended all of his father’s rehearsals at the famed Teatro Alla Scala from the time he was a young boy and it instilled in him a deep affinity for opera. Renata Tebaldi was his Godmother.

Siciliani studied at the Giuseppe Verdi Milano Conservatory and at Santa Cecilia in Rome graduating with highest honors in piano, composition, and conducting. He studied conducting with the legendary Franco Ferrara, Leonard Bernstein, Lorin Maazel, Ricardo Muti, and Zubin Mehta.

Siciliani also taught Theory and Solfeggio at the Conservatory of L’Aquila in Abruzzo 1979-1983, as well as Theory and Harmony at the Conservatory of Santa Cecilia in rome 1983-1988

Career 
After graduating from Santa Cecilia Conservatory, Siciliani started making guest conducting appearances with orchestras all over the United States and Europe including at the New York City Opera, Metropolitan Opera in New York, Opera company of Philadelphia, Wolf Trap in Washington, DC, Pittsburgh Symphony, Atlanta Symphony, Dallas Symphony, Prague symphony, Radio Orchestra of Munich, National Symphony

Orchestra of Mexico City, English Chamber Orchestra, Teatro dell’Opera of Rome, Teatro Liceo of Barcelona, as well as orchestras in Hong Kong, St. Petersburg, São Paulo, Buenos Aires and the National Symphony Orchestra in Washington, D.C. among others.

Maestro Siciliani took the helm of the Columbus Symphony Orchestra 1992-2004 where he led the orchestra’s first recordings in over 20 years and he took the Columbus Symphony Orchestra to debut at Carnegie Hall in 2001. He has a unique ability to take classical music and make it accessible to everyone and during his tenure with the Columbus symphony he continued to lead the orchestra performances to packed houses.

In 2010 until the present, Maestro Siciliani has returned to his operatic roots as the Music Director of Opera Project Columbus where he uses his talents to boost emerging opera talents from central Ohio and beyond.

Orchestra and Opera Appearances

Opera Houses

Italy 

 Teatro Dell’Opera of Rome
 Teatro San Carlo of Naples
 Teatro Massimo of Palermo
 Teatro Morlacchi of Perugia

Europe 

 Teatro Liceo of Barcellona
 Theatre de L’Opera of Nice
 Theatre de L’Opera of Marseilles
 Theatre de L’Opera of Avignone
 Theatre de L’Opera of Liege

United States 

 Metropolitan Opera in New York
 New York City Opera
 Cincinnati Opera Company
 Opera Company Louisville, Kentucky
 Opera Columbus, Columbus, Ohio
 Opera Project Columbus, Columbus, Ohio
 Opera Company of Philadelphia
 Opera Company of New Orleans
 Academy of Vocal Arts in Philadelphia
 Wolf Trap, Washington, DC
 Saratoga Springs Summer Festival

Symphony Orchestras

United States 

 Pittsburgh Symphony
 Washington National Symphony
 Cincinnati Symphony
 Atlanta Symphony
 Dallas Symphony
 Columbus Symphony Orchestra
 Buffalo Orchestra
 Jacksonville Symphony
 Nashville Symphony
 Ft. Worth Symphony
 Colorado Symphony
 Sacramento Symphony
 Long Beach Symphony Orchestra
 Grant Park Chicago Festival
 Grand Titan Festival
 Chautauqua Festival

Italy 

 Orchestra Sinfonica Siciliana (Palermo)
 Orchestra Sinfonica of Perugia
 Orchestra da Camera of Perugia
 Orchestra del Festival di Lanciano in Abruzzo
 Orchestra Sinfonica of Parma
 Orchestra Sinfonica Abruzzese in L’Aquila
 Orchestra Sinfonica of Bari
 Radio orchestra of Rome
 Orchestra Scarlatti of Naples
 Orchestra Sinfonica di Cagliari
 Festival Panatenee Pompeiane in Agrigento

Europe, Asia, and South America 

 Radio Orchestra of Munich
 Gurzenich-Orchester/Kolner Philarmoniker of Cologne, Germany
 Stockholm Philarmonik
 Goteborg Symphony
 English Chamber Orchestra
 Orchestra Symphonic of Warsaw
 Crakov Radio Orchestra
 Prague Symphony
 Orchestra Sinfonica of Bilbao, Spain
 Orchestre National du Capitol, Toulouse, France
 Orchestre National de Lyon
 Orchestra Sinfonica del Teatro de Sao Paulo
 Orchestra Sinfonica del Teatro Colon, Buenos Aires
 National Symphony Orchestra of Mexico City
 Orchestra Sinfonica di Jalapa, Mexico
 Hong Kong Symphony
 Spring Festival of Prague

Awards and Accolades 

 Carte de Paris, Boston, July 1992
 Amerigo Vespucci Award given to Italian conductors of international stature, 1992

Donal Henahan, New York Times,” The City Opera struck gold this time in finding a young Italian maestro, Alessandro Siciliani to conduct La Rondine.”

New York Times Music Critic John Rockwell declared Siciliani “the Lorin Maazel of opera conductors”

The Cincinnati Enquirer’s Janelle Gelfand said of Siciliani’s conducting of Turandot “One of the evening’s stars was conductor Alessandro Siciliani who was a thrilling interpreter of Puccini and aided the singers expertly.”

Compositions

 L'Amour Peintre (ballet)
 Giona (oratorio)
 Recherche #1 for small orchestra and organ
 Recherche #2 for large orchestra
 Cantata Divertimento for 4 vocal soloists, choir, and 18 instruments
 Terzetto Antico Colloquiale con Presenza Angelica Pastorale for oboe, clarinet, bassoon, harp, and string orchestra
 Piccola Suite Promenade for chamber orchestra
 Blue Notes for piano and orchestra
 Raccolta di Canti Popolari Toscani for different instrumental groupings
 Raccolta di Mottetti
 Psalm XXII for Tenor and Large Orchestra

Recordings 

 Live from Carnegie Hall, 2001
 CSO Showcase 2001
 Italian TV RAI: Otello by Rossini from Teatro Massimo di Palermo
 Italian TV RAI: Semiramide by Rossini from Teatro San Carlo of Naples
 Italian TV RAI:L Bossi, Poulenc Concertos for Organ, Barber adagio for Strings, Mendelssohn Symphony #1 Orchestra Scarlatti of Naples
 Italian TV RAI: The Last Symphony of Mozart at Vesuvio, Orchestra Scarlatti of Naples
 Recital of Montserrat Caballe’ at La Salle Playal in Paris

References

External links
 New York Times obituary of Francesco Siciliani

Italian conductors (music)
Italian male conductors (music)
Accademia Nazionale di Santa Cecilia alumni
1952 births
Living people
21st-century Italian conductors (music)
21st-century Italian male musicians
20th-century Italian conductors (music)
20th-century Italian male musicians
20th-century Italian composers
20th-century classical composers
21st-century Italian composers
21st-century classical composers
Italian classical composers
Italian male classical composers